Coral Ridge is a ridge trending north-south, transverse to the axis of Taylor Valley, Victoria Land. It forms a divide above sea level between Lake Fryxell and Explorers Cove, McMurdo Sound. A large number of solitary fossil corals have been found here by the New Zealand Antarctic Research Program and the U.S. Antarctic Research Program, whose teams jointly performed geological studies of the area. The name was suggested by Donald P. Elston of the United States Geological Survey, a research team member who worked at the ridge in the 1979–80 and 1980–81 seasons.

References
 

Ridges of Victoria Land
McMurdo Dry Valleys